Sant'Antonino di Susa is a comune (municipality) in the Metropolitan City of Turin in the Italian region Piedmont, located in the Val di Susa about  west of Turin.

References

Cities and towns in Piedmont